Lewis Doughty (born 24 December 1990) is an English male professional squash player. He achieved his highest career ranking of 214 on September, 2015 during the 2015 PSA World Tour.

References 

1990 births
Living people
English male squash players
Sportspeople from Manchester